Panagiotis Zorbas (born 21 April 1987) is a Greek professional footballer who plays as an attacking midfielder for Football League club Triglia.

Career
Zorbas was awarded the player of the year award for the South Group of the Greek third division for the season 2007–2008, which he spent playing for Panetolikos. He returned to AEK in the summer of 2008, but after getting little playing time, came back to Agrinio during the winter transfer season of 2008–2009, and was crucial in helping Panetolikos return to the Greek second division. Zorbas will continue his career at Heraklion club OFI. 2013 Zorbas will continue his career at AOK Kerkyra.

References

Living people
1987 births
Footballers from Athens
Greek footballers
AEK Athens F.C. players
Niki Volos F.C. players
Panetolikos F.C. players
OFI Crete F.C. players
PAE Kerkyra players
Association football midfielders